Weldaad is a community in the Mahaica-Berbice Region of Guyana on the Atlantic Ocean coast. It contains the areas' post office and a police station. The origin of the names comes from the plantation Weldaad, which was founded when the areas that make up Guyana were Dutch colonies.

References

Populated places in Mahaica-Berbice